The 1994 NBA All-Star Game was the 44th edition of the All-Star Game. The event was held in Minneapolis. The East All-Stars won the game with the score of 127–118. Scottie Pippen of the Chicago Bulls was voted MVP of the game.

It was broadcast by NBC for the fourth consecutive year.

Roster

 Alonzo Mourning and Charles Barkley did not participate due to injury. Karl Malone replaced Barkley in the West starting lineup.
 Charles Oakley and Gary Payton replaced Alonzo Mourning and Charles Barkley, respectively.

External links
1994 NBA All-Star Game

National Basketball Association All-Star Game
All-Star
Basketball competitions in Minneapolis
February 1994 sports events in the United States
1994 in sports in Minnesota
1990s in Minneapolis
GMA Network television specials
1994 in American sports